The Women's trap event at the 2018 Commonwealth Games was held on 13 April at the Belmont Shooting Centre, Brisbane.

Results

Qualification
Each shooter was allowed 75 shots. The top six shooters advanced to the final, with shoot-offs held to break ties if required.

Final
The lowest-ranked shooters were eliminated after 25 / 30 / 35 / 40 shots, with qualification rankings used to break ties if required. The last two shooters were permitted 10 further shots each, plus a shoot-off in the event of a gold-medal tie.

References

Women's trap
Comm